Armanitola Government High School is a secondary school for boys in Armanitola, in the old part of Dhaka, Bangladesh. It celebrated its centenary in 2004.

History
This school was established in 1904 by the British government, as an experimental school of the only teacher training college of East Bengal at that time. The school started at a vast campus with red brick buildings constructed in the British style at a location in front of the Tara Masjid (Star Mosque), a famous monument of Muslim architecture. Within a few years after its establishment, it drew attention of the city dwellers for its performance in education, sports and culture.

The school, however, could not sustain its name and fame during later years, particularly during the Pakistan period. Only by turning it into a government school in 1960 could it be saved from chronic financial crisis. Even after the independence of Bangladesh, it took a long time for the school to recover. Only since 1992 has it started to perform well. Armanitola Government High School is considered one of the best schools in old Dhaka.

Campus
Armanitola Government High School maintains a centralized campus consisting of three multi-storied buildings located at the heart of Armanitola, one of the busiest commercial spots of Old Dhaka. The school has a library, laboratory facilities, and two large and one small play grounds.

Academics
Armanitola Government High School has almost 1500 students, and 53 teachers, of whom 25 are women. The school offers courses in science and business studies.

Student activities
Armanitola Government High School offers many extracurricular activities. The Debating Club in particular regularly competes in inter-school competitions.

Financial aid
The school maintains low tuition fees compare to other private schools in Bangladesh, and students may apply annually for financial aid.

Publications
The school publishes an annual magazine named Unmesh.

Notable alumni
 Muhammed Abul Manzur, military general
 Pranab Mukherjee, 13th president of India.
 Bashir Ahmed, hockey, football, athletics and cricket player, later referee, coach, umpire and Olympic organiser
 Fazlur Rahman Khan, structural engineer and architect
 Muhammad Shahjahan, 6th vice-chancellor of Bangladesh University of Engineering and Technology
 Nooruddin Ahmed, 8th vice-chancellor of Bangladesh University of Engineering and Technology.

References

External links

Educational institutions established in 1904
High schools in Bangladesh
Schools in Dhaka District
1904 establishments in India